The 2016 Australian Formula 3 Premier Series is an Australian motor racing competition for cars constructed in accordance with FIA Formula 3 regulations. It is sanctioned by the Confederation of Australian Motor Sport (CAMS) as an Authorised Series, with Formula 3 Management Pty Ltd appointed as the Category Manager. The series began on 2 April at Sandown Raceway and will end on 13 November at Sydney Motorsport Park after seven triple-header rounds across three states. This was the first Australian Formula 3 Premier Series to be contested, with the Australian Formula 3 Championship having been discontinued at the end of 2015.

Teams and drivers

The following teams and drivers contested the 2016 Australian Formula 3 Premier Series. All teams and drivers were Australian-registered.

Classes
Competing cars are nominated into one of four classes:
 Premier Class – for automobiles constructed in accordance with the FIA Formula 3 regulations that applied in the year of manufacture between 1 January 2005 and 31 December 2011.
 National Class – for automobiles constructed in accordance with the FIA Formula 3 regulations that applied in the year of manufacture between 1 January 1999 and 31 December 2007.
 Kumho Cup Class – for automobiles constructed in accordance with the FIA Formula 3 regulations that applied in the year of manufacture between 1 January 1999 and 31 December 2004.
 Invitational Class.

Race calendar and results

Series standings

References

External links
 
 Online race results at www.natsoft.com.au
 Shannons Nationals

Fomula 3
Australian Formula 3 seasons
Australia
Australian Formula 3